The 2013–14 UEFA Europa League was the 43rd season of Europe's secondary club football tournament organised by UEFA, and the fifth season under its current title.

The 2014 UEFA Europa League Final was played between Sevilla and Benfica at the Juventus Stadium in Turin, Italy, which was won by Sevilla on penalties, giving them a record-equalling third UEFA Cup/Europa League title. Chelsea could not defend their title as they automatically qualified for the 2013–14 UEFA Champions League and also reached the knockout stage.

Association team allocation
A total of 194 teams from 53 of the 54 UEFA member associations participated in the 2013–14 UEFA Europa League (the exception being Gibraltar, which should start participating in the 2014–15 season after being admitted as a UEFA member in May 2013). The association ranking based on the UEFA country coefficients is used to determine the number of participating teams for each association:
Associations 1–6 each have three teams qualify.
Associations 7–9 each have four teams qualify.
Associations 10–51 (except Liechtenstein) each have three teams qualify.
Associations 52–53 each have two teams qualify.
 Liechtenstein has one team qualify (as it organises only a domestic cup and no domestic league).
The top three associations of the 2012–13 UEFA Respect Fair Play ranking each gain an additional berth.
Moreover, 33 teams eliminated from the 2013–14 UEFA Champions League are transferred to the Europa League.
The winners of the 2012–13 UEFA Europa League are given an additional entry as title holders if they do not qualify for the 2013–14 UEFA Champions League or Europa League through their domestic performance. However this additional entry is not necessary for this season, because the title holders qualified for European competitions through their domestic performance.

Association ranking
For the 2013–14 UEFA Europa League, the associations were allocated places according to their 2012 UEFA country coefficients, which took into account their performance in European competitions from 2007–08 to 2011–12.

Apart from the allocation based on the country coefficients, associations may have additional teams participating in the Europa League, as noted below:
 – Additional berth via Fair Play ranking (Sweden, Norway, Finland)
 – Additional teams transferred from the Champions League

Distribution
Since the title holders (Chelsea) qualified for the Champions League through their domestic performance, the group stage spot reserved for the title holders is vacated, and the following changes to the default allocation system are made:
The domestic cup winners of association 7 (Russia) are promoted from the play-off round to the group stage.
The domestic cup winners of association 16 (Cyprus) are promoted from the third qualifying round to the play-off round.
The domestic cup winners of association 19 (Czech Republic) are promoted from the second qualifying round to the third qualifying round.
The domestic cup winners of associations 33 (Republic of Ireland) and 34 (Slovenia) are promoted from the first qualifying round to the second qualifying round.

Redistribution rules
A Europa League place is vacated when a team qualifies for both the Champions League and the Europa League, or qualifies for the Europa League by more than one method. When a place is vacated, it is redistributed within the national association by the following rules:
When the domestic cup winners (considered as the "highest-placed" qualifier within the national association with the latest starting round) also qualify for the Champions League, their Europa League place is vacated. As a result, either of the following teams qualify for the Europa League:
The domestic cup runners-up, provided they have not yet qualified for European competitions, qualify for the Europa League as the "lowest-placed" qualifier (with the earliest starting round), with the other Europa League qualifiers moved up one "place".
Otherwise, the highest-placed team in the league which have not yet qualified for European competitions qualify for the Europa League, with the Europa League qualifiers which finish above them in the league moved up one "place".
When the domestic cup winners also qualify for the Europa League through league position, their place through the league position is vacated. As a result, the highest-placed team in the league which have not yet qualified for European competitions qualify for the Europa League, with the Europa League qualifiers which finish above them in the league moved up one "place" if possible.
For associations where a Europa League place is reserved for the League Cup winners, they always qualify for the Europa League as the "lowest-placed" qualifier (or as the second "lowest-placed" qualifier in cases where the cup runners-up qualify as stated above). If the League Cup winners have already qualified for European competitions through other methods, this reserved Europa League place is taken by the highest-placed league team in the league which have not yet qualified for European competitions.
A Fair Play place is taken by the highest-ranked team in the domestic Fair Play table which have not yet qualified for European competitions.

Teams
The labels in the parentheses show how each team qualified for the place of its starting round:
TH: Title holders
CW: Cup winners
CR: Cup runners-up
LC: League Cup winners
2nd, 3rd, 4th, 5th, 6th, etc.: League position
P-W: End-of-season European competition play-offs winners
FP: Fair Play
UCL: Transferred from the Champions League
GS: Third-placed teams from the group stage
PO: Losers from the play-off round
Q3: Losers from the third qualifying round

Notably six teams that did not play in their national top-division took part in the competition. They are: Hapoel Ramat Gan (2nd tier), Hødd (2nd), Pasching (3rd), Teteks (2nd), Vaduz (2nd) and Wigan Athletic (2nd).

Notes

Round and draw dates
The schedule of the competition was as follows (all draws held at UEFA headquarters in Nyon, Switzerland, unless stated otherwise).

Matches in the qualifying, play-off, and knockout rounds may also be played on Tuesdays or Wednesdays instead of the regular Thursdays due to scheduling conflicts.

Qualifying rounds

In the qualifying rounds and the play-off round, teams were divided into seeded and unseeded teams based on their 2013 UEFA club coefficients, and then drawn into two-legged home-and-away ties. Teams from the same association could not be drawn against each other.

First qualifying round
The draws for the first and second qualifying rounds were held on 24 June 2013. The first legs were played on 2, 3 and 4 July, and the second legs were played on 9, 10 and 11 July 2013.

Inter Turku lodged a protest after losing the second leg to Víkingur Gøta, and two match officials were later banned for life by UEFA for attempted match-fixing.

Notes

Second qualifying round
The first legs were played on 16 and 18 July, and the second legs were played on 25 July 2013.

Notes

Third qualifying round
The draw for the third qualifying round was held on 19 July 2013. The first legs were played on 1 August, and the second legs were played on 8 August 2013.

Play-off round

The draw for the play-off round was held on 9 August 2013. The first legs were played on 22 August, and the second legs were played on 29 August 2013.

Notes

Group stage

The draw for the group stage was held in Monaco on 30 August 2013. Prior to the draw, the Court of Arbitration for Sport upheld UEFA's ban on Fenerbahce (which lost in the Champions League play-off round) and Beşiktaş, meaning the two clubs were banned from the 2013–14 UEFA Europa League. UEFA decided to replace Beşiktaş in the Europa League group stage with Tromsø, who were eliminated by Beşiktaş in the play-off round, while a draw was held to select a team to replace Fenerbahçe among the teams eliminated in the play-off round, and was won by APOEL.

The 48 teams were allocated into four pots based on their 2013 UEFA club coefficients. They were drawn into twelve groups of four, with the restriction that teams from the same association could not be drawn against each other.

In each group, teams played against each other home-and-away in a round-robin format. The matchdays were 19 September, 3 October, 24 October, 7 November, 28 November, and 12 December 2013. The group winners and runners-up advanced to the round of 32, where they were joined by the 8 third-placed teams from the 2013–14 UEFA Champions League group stage.

A total of 27 associations were represented in the group stage. This was also the first time team from Kazakhstan qualified for group stage. Swansea City, Kuban Krasnodar, Sankt Gallen, Ludogorets, Chornomorets Odessa, Esbjerg, Elfsborg, Zulte Waregem, Wigan Athletic, Paços de Ferreira, Pandurii Târgu Jiu, Eintracht Frankfurt, APOEL, Thun, Slovan Liberec, SC Freiburg, Estoril, Real Betis, Vitória de Guimarães, Rijeka, Trabzonspor, Apollon Limassol, Tromsø and Shakhter Karagandy all made their debut in UEFA Europa League group stage (although Elfsborg, Zulte Waregem, Eintracht Frankfurt, Slovan Liberec, Vitória de Guimarães and Tromsø played already in UEFA Cup as well as Thun, Real Betis, Trabzonspor already disputed the UEFA Cup/UEFA Europa League knockout stage). 

 For tiebreakers if two or more teams are equal on points, see 2013–14 UEFA Europa League group stage#Tiebreakers

Group A

Group B

Group C

Group D

Group E

Group F

Group G

Group H

Group I

Group J

Group K

Group L

Knockout phase

In the knockout phase, teams played against each other over two legs on a home-and-away basis, except for the one-match final. The mechanism of the draws for each round was as follows:
In the draw for the round of 32, the twelve group winners and the four third-placed teams from the Champions League group stage with the better group records were seeded, and the twelve group runners-up and the other four third-placed teams from the Champions League group stage were unseeded. The seeded teams were drawn against the unseeded teams, with the seeded teams hosting the second leg. Teams from the same group or the same association could not be drawn against each other.
In the draws for the round of 16 onwards, there were no seedings, and teams from the same group or the same association could be drawn against each other.

Bracket

Round of 32
The draw for the round of 32 and round of 16 was held on 16 December 2013. The first legs were played on 20 February, and the second legs were played on 27 February 2014.

Round of 16
The first legs were played on 13 March, and the second legs were played on 20 March 2014.

Quarter-finals
The draw for the quarter-finals was held on 21 March 2014. The first legs were played on 3 April, and the second legs were played on 10 April 2014.

Semi-finals
The draw for the semi-finals and final (to determine the "home" team for administrative purposes) was held on 11 April 2014. The first legs were played on 24 April, and the second legs were played on 1 May 2014.

Final

Statistics
Statistics exclude qualifying rounds and play-off round.

Top goalscorers

Top assists

Squad of the season
The UEFA technical study group selected the following 18 players as the squad of the tournament:

See also
 2013–14 UEFA Champions League
 2014 UEFA Super Cup

References

External links

2013–14 UEFA Europa League

 
2
2013-14